Cyrille Kpan (born 30 May 1998) is an Ivorian-born Burkinabé football winger who currently plays for Sertanense.

References 

1998 births
Living people
Burkinabé footballers
Burkina Faso international footballers
US des Forces Armées players
Kawkab Marrakech players
Sertanense F.C. players
Association football wingers
Ivorian emigrants to Burkina Faso
Burkinabé expatriate footballers
Expatriate footballers in Morocco
Burkinabé expatriate sportspeople in Morocco
Expatriate footballers in Portugal
Burkinabé expatriate sportspeople in Portugal
Salitas FC players
21st-century Burkinabé people